Panagia is a village and a community of the Deskati municipality. Before the 2011 local government reform it was part of the municipality of Deskati, of which it was a municipal district. The 2011 census recorded 75 inhabitants in the village. The community of Panagia covers an area of 67.555 km2.

See also
 List of settlements in the Grevena regional unit

References

Populated places in Grevena (regional unit)